Joseph Kwesi Mbimadong (born 1931) is a Ghanaian politician and a teacher. He served as member of the first parliament of the second republic of Ghana for Gonja East constituency in the Northern Region of Ghana.

Early life and education 
Mbimadong was born in 1931 in the Northern Region of Ghana, he attended Bunda Boarding School and Pusiga Government Training College where he obtained his Teachers' Training Certificate.

Career and politics 
Mbimadong was a teacher by profession. He was elected during the 1969 Ghanaian parliamentary election as member of the first parliament of the second republic of Ghana on the ticket of the National Alliance of Liberals (NAL). He was succeeded by Francis Kwame Donkor of the People's National Party (PNP) in 1979 Ghanaian general election.

Personal life 
Mbimadong is a Christian.

References 

1931 births
National Alliance of Liberals politicians
Ghanaian MPs 1969–1972
Ghanaian educators
People from Northern Region (Ghana)
Ghanaian Christians
Living people